2-Iodoxybenzoic acid (IBX) is an organic compound used in organic synthesis as an oxidizing agent. This periodinane is especially suited to oxidize alcohols to aldehydes. IBX is prepared from 2-iodobenzoic acid, potassium bromate, and sulfuric acid. Frigerio and co-workers have also demonstrated, in 1999 that potassium bromate may be replaced by commercially available Oxone. One of the main drawbacks of IBX is its limited solubility; IBX is insoluble in many common organic solvents. In the past, it was believed that IBX was shock sensitive, but it was later proposed that samples of IBX were shock sensitive due to the residual potassium bromate left from its preparation. Commercial IBX is stabilized by carboxylic acids such as benzoic acid and isophthalic acid.

Reaction mechanism
The reaction mechanism for an oxidation of an alcohol to an aldehyde according to the hypervalent twisting mechanism involves a ligand exchange reaction replacing the hydroxyl group by the alcohol followed by a twist and an elimination reaction. The twist is a requirement because the iodine to oxygen double bond is oriented out of plane with the alkoxy group and the concerted elimination would not be able to take place. This twist reaction is a rearrangement in which the oxygen atom is moved into a proper plane for a 5 membered cyclic transition state in the elimination reaction and is calculated by Computational chemistry to be the rate-determining step in the oxidation. The twist mechanism also explains why oxidation is faster for larger alcohols than for small alcohols. The twist is driven forward by the steric hindrance that exists between the ortho hydrogen atom and the protons from the alkoxy group and larger alkoxy groups create larger steric repulsion. The same computation predicts a much faster reacting IBX derivative with a 100 fold reaction rate when this ortho hydrogen atom is replaced by a methyl group thus facilitating the twist until the elimination reaction takes prevalence as the rate determining step.

IBX exists as two tautomers one of which is the carboxylic acid. The acidity of IBX which has been determined in water (pKa 2.4) and DMSO (pKa 6.65) is known to affect organic reactions, for instance acid-catalyzed isomerization accompanying oxidations.

Scope
IBX is also available as silica gel or polystyrene bound IBX. In many applications, IBX is replaced by Dess–Martin periodinane which is more soluble in common organic solvents. A sample reaction is an IBX oxidation used in the total synthesis of eicosanoid: More and Finney and Van Arman have demonstrated that common organic solvents are suitable for many IBX oxidations, despite its low solubility, and in fact may simplify product purification.

In 2001, K. C. Nicolaou and co-workers published a series of papers in the Journal of the American Chemical Society demonstrating, among other transformations, the use of IBX to oxidize primary and secondary benzylic carbons to aromatic aldehydes and ketones, respectively.

Oxidative cleavage
IBX is notable for oxidizing vicinal diols (or glycols) to diketones without cleavage of the carbon-carbon bond, but oxidative cleavage of glycols to two aldehydes or ketones can occur when modified conditions are used (elevated temperatures or trifluoroacetic acid solvent).

The reaction mechanism for this glycol cleavage is based on initial formation of an adduct between 10-I-4 IBX and DMSO to a 12-I-5 intermediate 3 in which DMSO acts as a leaving group for incoming alcohol 4 to intermediate 5. One equivalent of water is split off forming 12-I-5 spirobicyclic periodinane 6 setting the stage for fragmentation to 7. With hydroxyl alpha protons present, oxidation to the acyloin competes. Trifluoroacetic acid is found to facilitate the overall reaction.

α-Hydroxylations
Kirsch and co-workers were able to hydroxylate keto compounds with IBX in α-position under mild conditions. This method could be extended to β-keto esters.

Oxidation of β-hydroxyketones to β-diketones
Bartlett and Beaudry discovered that IBX is a valuable reagent for the transformation of β-hydroxyketones to β-diketones. IBX provides yields superior to both the Swern and Dess–Martin oxidation protocols.

References

Iodates
Periodinanes
Iodine heterocycles
Oxygen heterocycles
Reagents for organic chemistry
Oxidizing agents
Heterocyclic compounds with 2 rings